Christine of Saxony (25 December 1505 – 15 April 1549) was a German noble, landgravine consort of Hesse by marriage to Philip I, Landgrave of Hesse. She was the regent of Hesse during the absence of her spouse in 1547–1549.

She was the daughter of George the Bearded, Duke of Saxony and Barbara Jagiellon. On 11 December 1523 in Kassel, she married Landgrave Philip I, Landgrave of Hesse. The marriage was arranged to forge an alliance between Hesse and Saxony and was unhappy; Philip claimed to be disgusted by her and only shared her bed by duty. They had ten children.

Whilst married to Christine, Philip practised bigamy and had another nine children with his other (morganatic) wife, Margarethe von der Saale; in 1540, Christine gave her consent to her husband's bigamy with his lover because of her view upon him as her sovereign. Margarethe von der Saale, however, was never seen at court.

During Philip's absence and captivity during 1547–1549, Christine was regent jointly with her oldest son. She died before Philip's release in 1552.

Children with Philip of Hesse
 Agnes (31 May 1527 – 4 November 1555), married:
 in Marburg on 9 January 1541 to Maurice, Elector of Saxony;
 in Weimar on 26 May 1555 to John Frederick II, Duke of Saxe-Gotha.
 Anna (26 October 1529 – 10 July 1591), married on 24 February 1544 to Wolfgang, Count Palatine of Zweibrücken.
 William IV of Hesse-Kassel (or Hesse-Cassel) (24 June 1532 – 25 August 1592).
 Philipp Ludwig (29 June 1534 – 31 August 1535).
 Barbara (8 April 1536 – 8 June 1597), married:
 in Reichenweier on 10 September 1555 to Duke George I of Württemberg-Mömpelgard;
 in Kassel on 11 November 1568 to Count Daniel of Waldeck.
 Louis IV of Hesse-Marburg (27 May 1537 – 9 October 1604).
 Elisabeth (13 February 1539 – 14 March 1582), married on 8 July 1560 to Louis VI, Elector Palatine.
 Philip II of Hesse-Rheinfels (22 April 1541 – 20 November 1583).
 Christine (29 June 1543 – 13 May 1604), married in Gottorp on 17 December 1564 to Adolf, Duke of Holstein-Gottorp.
 Georg I of Hesse-Darmstadt (10 September 1547 – 7 February 1596).

Ancestry

References

1505 births
1549 deaths
House of Wettin
Landgravines of Hesse
Nobility from Dresden
16th-century women rulers
Regents of Germany
Albertine branch
Daughters of monarchs